Estonian vocabulary, i.e., the vocabulary of the Estonian language, was influenced by many other language groups.

Germanic languages
The heaviest external contribution, nearly one third of the vocabulary, comes from Germanic languages, mainly from Low Saxon (Middle Low German) during the period of German rule, and High German (including standard German). The percentage of Low Saxon and High German loanwords can be estimated at 22–25 percent, with Low Saxon making up about 15 percent.

Ex nihilo lexical enrichment
Estonian language planners such as Ado Grenzstein (a journalist active in Estonia in the 1870s–90s) tried to use formation ex nihilo, Urschöpfung, i.e. they created new words out of nothing. Examples are Ado Grenzstein's coinages kabe ‘draughts, chequers’ and male ‘chess’.

The most famous reformer of Estonian, Johannes Aavik (1880–1973), also used creations ex nihilo (cf. ‘free constructions’, Tauli 1977), along with other sources of lexical enrichment such as derivations, compositions and loanwords (often from Finnish; cf. Saareste and Raun 1965: 76). Aavik belonged to the so-called Noor Eesti (‘Young Estonia’) movement, which appeared in Tartu, a university town in south-eastern Estonia, around 1905 (for discussion, see Raun 1991). In Aavik's dictionary (1921), which lists approximately 4000 words, there are many words which were (allegedly) created ex nihilo. Consider • ese ‘object’, • kolp ‘skull’, • liibuma ‘to cling’, • naasma ‘to return, come back’, • nõme ‘stupid, dull’, • range ‘strict’, • reetma ‘to betray’, • solge ‘slim, flexible, graceful’ (which did not gain currency, cf. Contemporary Estonian graatsiline ‘graceful’, although the word itself is used for a parasitic worm, namely Ascaris lumbricoides), and • veenma ‘to convince’. Other Aavikisms ex nihilo (not appearing in Aavik 1921) include • nentima ‘to admit, state’, • nördima ‘to grow indignant’, • süüme ‘conscience’, and • tõik ‘fact’."

Note, however, that many of the coinages that have been considered (often by Aavik himself) as words concocted ex nihilo could well have been influenced by foreign lexical items, for example words from Russian, German, French, Finnish, English and Swedish. Aavik had a broad classical education and knew Ancient Greek, Latin and French. Consider • relv ‘weapon’ versus English revolver, • roim ‘crime’ versus English crime, • siiras ‘sincere’ versus English sincere/serious • embama ‘to embrace’ versus English embrace, and • taunima ‘to condemn, disapprove’ versus Finnish tuomita ‘to judge’ (these Aavikisms appear in Aavik's 1921 dictionary). Consider also • evima ‘to have, possess, own’ (cf. also Estonian omama ‘to own’, and mul on, lit. ‘to me is’, i.e. ‘for me there is’, meaning ‘I have’) versus English have; • laup ‘forehead’ versus Russian лоб lob ‘forehead’; • mõrv ‘murder’ and mõrvama ‘to murder’ versus English murder and German Mord (these Aavikisms do not appear in Aavik 1921); and • laip ‘corpse’ versus German Leib ‘body’ and German Leiche ‘body, corpse’. These words might be better regarded as a peculiar manifestation of morpho-phonemic adaptation of a foreign lexical item. The often irregular and arbitrary sound changes could then be explained not as subconscious foreign influence but rather as conscious manipulation by the coiner. Aavik seems to have paid little attention to the origin of his neologisms. On occasion, he replaced existing native words or expressions with neologisms of foreign descent. Therefore, Aavik cannot be considered a purist in the traditional sense, i.e. he was not ‘anti-foreignisms/loanwords’ as such.

Tables of word origin

Inherited vocabulary

Inherited vocabulary in Estonian can be classified according to how far off they have cognates among the other Uralic languages.
 "Uralic" words have known cognates in the Samoyedic languages.
 "Finno-Ugric" words have known cognates at furthest in the Ugric languages.
 "Finno-Permic" words have known cognates at furthest in the Permic languages.
 "Finno-Volgaic" words have known cognates at furthest in the Mari language or the Mordvinic languages (formerly known as "Volgaic").
 "Finno-Samic" words have known cognates at furthest in the Samic languages.
 "Finnic" words have known cognates only among the Finnic languages.
All these groups correspond to different proposed subgroups of the Uralic languages. However, the historical reality of most groupings is disputed. In principle e.g. a "Finno-Permic" word may be just as old as a "Uralic" word, just one whose descendants have not survived to the modern Samoyedic and Ugric languages.

Loanwords

Other

References

Further reading
 Soosaar, Sven-Erik. "The Origins of Stems of Standard Estonian - A statistical overview". In: TRAMES: A Journal of the Humanities & Social Sciences 17 (67/62), 3. 2013. pp. 273–300.

Vocabulary
Lexis (linguistics)